Great Falls Transit provides public transportation to Great Falls and Black Eagle in Cascade County, Montana. The bus service was founded in 1982 and offers seven routes on weekdays.

Routes
All routes meet downtown.

References

External links
Great Falls Transit District

Bus transportation in Montana